Agyneta saxatilis is a species of sheet weaver found in Europe and Russia. It was described by Blackwall in 1844.

References

saxatilis
Spiders described in 1844
Spiders of Europe
Spiders of Russia